Envoyé spécial (English: Special correspondent) is a French television weekly investigative newsmagazine show that has run on channel France 2 since 1990. It has been presented by Élise Lucet since 2016.

References

French documentary television series
1990 French television series debuts
1990s French television series
2000s French television series
2010s French television series